Warschau may refer to:
German name of Warsaw, Poland
Warschau (album)
KL Warschau, or Warsaw concentration camp, Nazi concentration camp in the city